The Old Country is a 1921 British silent drama film directed by A. V. Bramble and starring Gerald McCarthy, Kathleen Vaughan and Haidee Wright.

Cast
 Gerald McCarthy – James Fountain 
 Kathleen Vaughan – Mary Lorimer 
 Haidee Wright – Mrs. Fountain 
 George Bellamy – Squire 
 Ethel Newman – Annette Alborough 
 Stanley Roberts – Austin Wells 
 Sidney Paxton – Steward

References

External links
 

1921 films
British drama films
British silent feature films
Films directed by A. V. Bramble
1921 drama films
British films based on plays
Ideal Film Company films
British black-and-white films
1920s English-language films
1920s British films
Silent drama films